CEPT Recommendation T/CD 06-01 was a standard set in 1981 by the European Conference of Postal and Telecommunications Administrations (CEPT) for the display of Videotex; specifically, for the Videotex Presentation Layer Data Syntax. It was revised a number of times in the 1980s, and also later redesignated as recommendation T/TE 06-01.

The standard aimed to bring a degree of harmonisation between Europe's emerging videotex systems, which had been diverging along national lines.  It recognised four baseline profiles (with conformance criteria set out in Annex C) based on existing videotex services:

 CEPT1: BTX (Germany)
 CEPT2: Teletel (France)
 CEPT3: Prestel (UK)
 CEPT4: Prestel Plus (Sweden)

and defined criteria for a "harmonised enhanced" service.

National videotex services were encouraged to either follow one of the existing four basic profiles; or if they extended them, to do so in ways compatible with the harmonised enhanced specification.

Responsibility for the standard was passed to the new European Telecommunications Standards Institute (ETSI) in 1988.  The ETSI version of the standard is designated ETS 300 072.

External links 
 ETS 300 072 ETSI version of the standard, November 1990. Equivalent to CEPT T/CD 06-01 as amended to October 1988.
 ETS 300 072 A1, Amendment with various additions, October 1996.

Videotex